Oud Eik en Duinen is a cemetery in The Hague, the Netherlands, formerly called Eik en Duinen and also nicknamed "the Dutch Père-Lachaise". The cemetery is built around a chapel constructed around 1247 by William II of Holland in honor of his father, Floris IV, Count of Holland. This chapel was partially demolished in 1581, and in the 17th century the area was again used as a cemetery. When Eik en Duinen was full, a new cemetery, was constructed in 1891 across the road, and since then the old cemetery is known as "Old" Eik en Duinen.

A 
 Peter van Anrooy (1879–1954), composer, conductor
 Jan Apol (1874–1945), painter
 Simone Arnoux (1915–2001), spouse of Prince Aschwin of Lippe-Biesterfeld, brother of Prince Bernhard of Lippe-Biesterfeld (Prince Bernhard Leopold Frederik Everhard Julius Coert Karel Godfried Pieter of Lippe-Biesterfeld)
 Tobias Asser (1838–1913), lawyer and winner of the Nobel Peace Prize in 1911.

B 
 Daniel Johannes von Balluseck (1895–1976), newspaper editor (Algemeen Handelsblad), diplomat
 Johan Hendrik Christiaan Basting (1817–1870), army doctor and promotor founding of the Red Cross
 Diederik Jacobus den Beer Poortugael (1800–1879), officer (Military William Order), poet
 Eduard Willem Bischoff van Heemskerck (1850–1934), colonel (Military William Order)
 Willem Frederik Karel Bischoff van Heemskerck (1852–1915), general-major
 Ferdinand Bordewijk (1884–1965), writer
 Johan Jacob Boreel (1869–1934), lieutenant-colonel (Military William Order)
 Christiaan ten Bosch (1840–1924), vice-admiral
 Pieter Brijnen van Houten (1907–1991), spy
 Herman Brockmann (1871–1936), rower
 Pieter Cornelis Boutens (1870–1943), poet
 Menno ter Braak (1902–1940), writer
 Louis Christiaan van den Brandeler (1855–1911), general-major, gouverneur Koninklijke Militaire Academie
 Klaas Buchly (1910–1965), Dutch track cyclist

C 
 John Malcolm Campbell (1845–1928), Lieutenant-general
 Eduard Willem van der Capellen (1863–1935), Major-general
 François de Casembroot (1817–1895), vice-admiral, (Military William Order)
 Jan Frans Adolf Coertzen (1801–1863), schout-bij-nacht, (Military William Order)
 Wouter Cool (1848–1928), luitenant-generaal, Minister van Oorlog
 Jean Henri Coronel (1846–1934), adjudant-onderofficier, (Military William Order)
 Pieter Cort van der Linden (1846–1935), politician
 Louis Couperus (as) (1863–1923), writer
 Elisabeth Couperus-Baud (as) (1867–1960), writer and translator

D 
 Willy Derby (1886–1944), singer
 Franz Deutmann (1867–1915), painter
 Herman Deutmann (1870–1926), royal photographer
 Karel Hugo van Diepenbrugge (1817–1889), general-major, inspecteur der artillerie
 Johan Hendrik Doeleman (1848–1913), artist
 Willem Hendrik Doorman (1799–1873), general (Military William Order)
 Willem Drees (1886–1988), politician
 Toon Dupuis (1877–1937), sculptor

E 
 Jacob Nicolaes Everts (1785–1846), lieutenant-general (Military William Order)

F 
 Isaäc Dignus Fransen van de Putte (1822–1902), Minister van Koloniën

G 
 Willem Karel van Gennep (1823–1900), viceadmiraal (Military William Order)
 Neville Davison Goldsmid (1814–1875), industrialist, art collector
 Jan de Graan (1852–1874), violinist
 Dirk de Graeff van Polsbroek (1833-1916), Diplomat in Japan
 Walter Robert de Greve (1864–1924), commandant Koninklijk Nederlandsch-Indisch leger (Military William Order)

H 
 Panthaleon Emile Hajenius (1874–1939), kolonel (Military William Order)
 Hendrik Hamakers (1834–1916), majoor, ridder Militaire Willems-Orde
 Jacobus Diderik Jan van der Hegge Spies (1830–1895), kapitein-ter-zee (Military William Order)
 Hans Hirschfeld (1899–1961), econoom
 Carel Hendrik Hoedt (1862–1932), kapitein Koninklijk Nederlandsch-Indisch Leger (Military William Order)
 Samuel van Houten (1837–1930),  Minister of the Interior

I 
 Ernst Franz Insinger (1870–1930), lieutenant-general

J 
 Gerrit Jäger (1863–1894), journalist, playwright

K 
 Rijnholt Antony Klerck (1774–1854), lieutenant-general (Military William Order)
 Johan Philip Koelman (1818–1893), painter, sculptor, writer
 Cornelis Eliza van Koetsveld (1807–1893), preacher and writer
 Gijsbertus Johannes van Kooten (1851–1923), lieutenant-general (Military William Order)
 Gerhardus Kruys (1838–1902), viceadmiraal
 Roelof Kuipers (1855–1922), architect
 Abraham Kuyper (1837–1920), politician, theologian
 Henriëtte Kuyper (1870–1932), writer
 Albert Christian Kruyt (1869–1949), missionary, ethnographer and theologian
 Pyaromir Maheboob Khan (1887–1948), Sufi spiritual leader and musician
 Pir-o-Murshid Mohammad Ali Khan (1881–1958), Sufi spiritual leader and musician

L 
 Gerardus van der Leeuw (1890–1950), theoloog en minister van Onderwijs, Kunsten en Wetenschappen
 Aschwin zur Lippe-Biesterfeld (1914–1988), broer van Prins Bernhard
 Johannes Servaas Lotsy (1808–1863), minister van Marine en van Koloniën, minister van Staat
 Pieter Louwerse (1840–1908), schrijver, dichter en schoolmeester

M 
 Norman MacLeod (1811-1896), lieutenant-general
 Johan de Meester (1860-1931), writer, journalist
 Dirk Matak Fontein (1840–1912), officier der gezondheid (Military William Order)
 Hendrik Willem Mesdag (1831–1915), schilder
 Sientje Mesdag-van Houten (1834–1909), painter
 Piet Moeskops (1893–1964), cyclist
 Hendrik Pieter Nicolaas Muller (1859–1941), merchant, traveler, diplomat

N 
 Adriaan Johan Charles de Neve (1857–1913), assistent-resident te Atjeh, ridder Militaire Willems-Orde
 Gerardus Philippus Marius van der Noordaa (1847–1904), majoor, ridder Militaire Willems-Orde

O 
 Antonie Frederik Jan Floris Jacob van Omphal (1788–1863), luitenant-generaal

P 
 Jan Pieter Paauwe (1872–1956), predikant
 Jean-Louis Pisuisse (1880–1927), zanger en cabaretier
 Nicolaas Jules Cesar van Polanen Petel (1855–1922), kapitein Koninklijk Nederlandsch-Indisch Leger (Military William Order)
 Willem Frederik Pop (1858–1931), Minister van Oorlog

Q 
 Huibert Quispel (1841–1921), vice-admiral (Military William Order)

R 
 Johan Hendrik Ram (1861–1913), luchtvaartpionier, officier en oorlogsverslaggever; vriend van Louis Couperus
 Paul du Rieu (1859 (?)–1901), architect
 Julius Constantijn Rijk (1814–1891), admiral (Military William Order)
 Albert Johan Roest (1837–1920), burgemeester van Den Haag van 1887 tot 1897
 Leonardus Johannes Warnerus van Rouveroy (1818–1897), major (Military William Order)
 Leonard Henri Ruyssenaers (1850–1913), secretaris-generaal Hof van Arbitrage

S 
 Andreas Schelfhout (1787–1870), painter
 Jakob van Schevichaven (1866–1935), writer
 Aegidius Clemens August Schönstedt (1811–1881), lieutenant-general (Military William Order)
 Jérôme Alexander Sillem (1902–1986), bankier
 Jan Elias Nicolaas Sirtema van Grovestins (1842–1919), lieutenant-general (Military William Order)
 Louis Philip Jacob Snabilié (1797–1865), officier van gezondheid (Military William Order)
 Cornelis Jacobus Snijders (1852–1939), luitenant-generaal, ridder Militaire Willems-Orde
 Alfred van Sprang (1917–1960), journalist
 Jan Springer (1850–1915), architect
 Nicolaas Pieter van der Stok (1841–1907), officier van gezondheid (Military William Order)
 Jacques Henri Leonard Jean Sweerts de Landas Wyborgh (1851–1912), vice-admiral
 Jan van Swieten (1807–1888), commandant Koninklijk Nederlandsch-Indisch leger

T 
 Adriën Telders (1843–1913), vicepresident Hoge Raad der Nederlanden
 Henricus Martinus Tersteege (1828–1916), luitenant-kolonel (Military William Order)
 Jaap van Till (1900–1977), banker
 Jan Tinbergen (1903–1994), econoom
 Frederik Willem Hendrik Tuinenburg (1857–1921), majoor Koninklijk Nederlandsch-Indisch Leger (Military William Order)
 Ernest Frederik Christiaan Hendrik Joan van Tuyll van Serooskerken (1850–1916), general-major

V 
 Koen Verhoeff (1928–1989), sports reporter
 Han Voskuil (1926–2008), writer

W 
 Davina van Wely (1922–2004) (ashes), violinist
 Johan Lodewijk Leonard Marinus Wittich (1858–1941), first lieutenant, Royal Netherlands East Indies Army
 Albert Willem Frederik Cornelis van Woerden (1851–1914), schout-bij-nacht

Y 
 Yi Tjoune (1859–1907), Korean diplomat (reburied in Korea in 1963)

External links

 History
 

Cemeteries in the Netherlands
Cemeteries in South Holland
Buildings and structures in The Hague
History of The Hague